The 66th season of the Campeonato Gaúcho kicked off on February 16, 1986 and ended on July 20, 1986. Fourteen teams participated. Grêmio won their 24th title. Aimoré and Grêmio Bagé were relegated.

Participating teams

System 
The championship would have two stages.:

 First phase: The fourteen clubs played each other in a double round-robin system. The four best teams in the sum of both rounds qualified into the Final phase, with the winners of each round earning one bonus point, and the two teams with the fewest points were relegated.
 Final phase: The four remaining teams played each other in a double round-robin system; the team with the most points won the title.

Championship

First phase

First round

Second round

Final standings

Final phase

References 

Campeonato Gaúcho seasons
Gaúcho